Santa María Rayón is a town and the municipal seat of the Rayón Municipality, State of Mexico in Mexico.

References

Populated places in the State of Mexico
Municipality seats in the State of Mexico

https://commons.wikimedia.org/wiki/File:Monumento_al_artesano,_Escultor_Mart%C3%ADn_Camilo_Enriquez_Loza.jpg